Mukesh Choudhary is an Indian politician and a member of the 18th Legislative Assembly of Uttar Pradesh, representing the Nakur Assembly constituency of Uttar Pradesh. He is a member of the Bharatiya Janata Party.

Early life and education

Mukesh Chaudhary was born on 15 March 1967 in Saharanpur, Uttar Pradesh, in the family of Kirpal Singh.  Mukesh grew up in Saharanpur and graduated in Agriculture from Chaudhary Charan Singh University, Meerut.

Political career

In the 2022 Uttar Pradesh Legislative Assembly election, Choudhary represented Bharatiya Janata Party as a candidate from the Nakur Assembly constituency and defeated Dharam Singh Saini of the Samajwadi Party by a margin of 155 votes.

Posts held

See also
 Nakur Assembly constituency
 18th Uttar Pradesh Assembly
 Uttar Pradesh Legislative Assembly

References

External links 
Facebook

1967 births
1960s births
Living people
Indian Hindus
Indian farmers
People from Uttar Pradesh
Indian nationalists
Indian political people
Politicians of Hindu political parties
Bharatiya Janata Party politicians from Uttar Pradesh
Uttar Pradesh MLAs 2022–2027
Indian politicians
People from Saharanpur district
Chaudhary Charan Singh University alumni